Godwin Obaje (born 12 March 1996) is a Nigerian footballer who plays as a striker for Abia Warriors.

Career

In 2015, Obaje signed for Slovak side Trenčín. He was the top scorer of the 2016 Nigeria Professional Football League with 18 goals. In 2016, he trialed for Spartak (Moscow) in the Russian top flight. In 2019, Obaje  signed for JSK (Kairouan) in Tunisia. In 2020, he signed for Nigerian team Abia Warriors.

References

External links
 Godwin Obaje at playmakerstats.com

Nigerian footballers
Expatriate footballers in Tunisia
Association football forwards
Living people
1996 births
Nigerian expatriate sportspeople in Slovakia
Akwa United F.C. players
JS Kairouan players
AS Trenčín players
Nigeria Professional Football League players
Plateau United F.C. players
Wikki Tourists F.C. players
Ifeanyi Ubah F.C. players
Nigerian expatriate sportspeople in Tunisia
Nigerian expatriate footballers
Expatriate footballers in Slovakia